Jonathan Lewis may refer to:

Entertainment
Jonathan Guy Lewis (born 1963), English actor
Johnny Lewis (1983–2012), American actor
Jonathan Lewis (artist) (born 1970), visual artist

Sports
Jonathan Lewis (American football) (born 1984), American football player
Jonathan Lewis (soccer) (born 1997), American soccer player
Jonathan Lewis (motorsport), driver and manager
Jon Lewis (cricketer, born 1970), English player and coach

Other
Jonathan Lewis (oncologist) (born 1959), oncologist and cancer drug developer
Jonathan Lewis (died c. 1820), alleged murderer of Omie Wise

See also
Jon Lewis (disambiguation)
John Lewis (disambiguation)